Mordellaria latior is a species of beetle in the genus Mordellaria of the family Mordellidae. It was described in 1967.

References

Beetles described in 1967
Mordellidae